Hinsdale is one of three stations on Metra's BNSF Line in Hinsdale, Illinois, and the only one open daily (the other two are only served during rush hours). In Metra's zone-based fare system, Hinsdale is in zone D. As of 2018, Hinsdale is the 35th busiest of Metra's 236 non-downtown stations, with an average of 1,155 weekday boardings. There is a historic staffed station and commercial use building. Originally known as the Brush Hill Train Station, the depot was designed for the Chicago, Burlington and Quincy Railroad by staff architect Walter Theodore Krausch, built by Grace & Hyde Company in 1899, and is listed as a contributing building in the Downtown Hinsdale Historic District.

References

External links 

Hinsdale, Illinois Railroad Crossings (Mike's Railroad Crossing Website)
Flickr Photo
Station from Garfield Avenue from Google Maps Street View
Station from Washington Street from Google Maps Street View

Metra stations in Illinois
Former Chicago, Burlington and Quincy Railroad stations
Hinsdale, Illinois
Historic district contributing properties in Illinois
National Register of Historic Places in DuPage County, Illinois
Railway stations on the National Register of Historic Places in Illinois
Railway stations in DuPage County, Illinois
Railway stations in the United States opened in 1899